Gulberg may refer to several places in Pakistan:

 Gulberg Town, Karachi
 Gulberg, Lahore
 Gulberg, Faisalabad

See also
 Gullberg (disambiguation)